Francis Leonard Garrett (1919-1992) was a Rear Admiral and Chief of Chaplains of the United States Navy.

Biography
Garrett was born on April 7, 1919. He attended Wofford College, Emory University and Union Theological Seminary. Garrett died on May 13, 1992 and is buried at Arlington National Cemetery.

Career
Garrett was commissioned a lieutenant (junior grade) in the United States Navy during World War II and was assigned to Naval Air Station Alameda.

From 1965 to 1966, Garrett served in the Vietnam War as Force Chaplain of the III Marine Amphibious Force. During this time, he was awarded the Legion of Merit. In 1969, he became Fleet Chaplain of the United States Atlantic Fleet. The following year, he was named Chief of Chaplains and remained in the position until his retirement in 1975.

Following his retirement from the Navy, Garrett served as Senior Minister at Epworth United Methodist Church in Norfolk, Virginia. He was married to an Associate Reformed Presbyterian (White Oak Patrick).

References

1919 births
1992 deaths
Chiefs of Chaplains of the United States Navy
Recipients of the Legion of Merit
United States Navy personnel of the Vietnam War
Wofford College alumni
Emory University alumni
Union Theological Seminary (New York City) alumni
Burials at Arlington National Cemetery
American United Methodist clergy
United States Navy personnel of World War II
United States Navy rear admirals
20th-century American clergy